The ALCO RSD-4 was a  six axle diesel-electric locomotive built by the American Locomotive Company between 1951 and 1952. It was a derivative of the four-axle ALCO RS-3, with two additional powered axles which allowed better tractive effort at lower speeds. Due to the inadequate capacity of the main generator, this model was later superseded in production by the ALCO RSD-5.

Original owners

Preserved units
The only ALCO RSD-4 that has survived is Kennecott Copper Corporation #201. It resided at the Northwest Railway Museum until November 2021 (formerly known as the Puget Sound & Snoqualmie Valley Railway) in Snoqualmie, Washington in its orange Kennecott paint scheme. As of 2021, it has been returned to Ely, Nevada (along with EMD SD7 #401) to the Nevada Northern Railway Museum.

References

C-C locomotives
RSD-04
Diesel-electric locomotives of the United States
Railway locomotives introduced in 1951
Standard gauge locomotives of the United States